The Lord Steward or Lord Steward of the Household is an official of the Royal Household in England. He is always a peer. Until 1924, he was always a member of the Government. Until 1782, the office was one of considerable political importance and carried Cabinet rank. 

The Lord Steward receives his appointment from the Sovereign in person and bears a white staff as the emblem and warrant of his authority. He is the first dignitary of the court. In the House of Lords Precedence Act 1539, an Act of Parliament for placing of the lords, he is described as the grand master or lord steward of the king's most honourable household. He presided at the Board of Green Cloth, until the Board of Green Cloth disappeared in the reform of local government licensing in 2004, brought about by the Licensing Act 2003 (section 195). In his department are the Treasurer of the Household and Comptroller of the Household, who rank next to him. These officials were usually peers or the sons of peers and Privy Councillors. They also sat at the Board of Green Cloth, carry white staves, and belong to the ministry. The offices are now held by Government whips in the House of Commons. The duties which in theory belong to the Lord Steward, Treasurer and Comptroller of the Household are in practice performed by the Master of the Household, who is a permanent officer and resides in the palace.

The Master of the Household is a white-staff officer and was a member of the Board of Green Cloth but not of the ministry, and among other things he presided at the daily dinners of the suite in waiting on the sovereign. He is not named in the Black Book of Edward IV or in the Statutes of Henry VIII and is entered as master of the household and clerk of the green cloth in the Household Book of Queen Elizabeth. But he has superseded the lord steward of the household, as the lord steward of the household at one time superseded the Lord High Steward of England.

In the Lord Steward's department were the officials of the Board of Green Cloth, the Coroner ("coroner of the verge"), and Paymaster of the Household, and the officers of the Royal Almonry. Other offices in the department were those of the Cofferer of the Household, the Treasurer of the Chamber, and the Paymaster of Pensions, but these, with six clerks of the Board of Green Cloth, were abolished in 1782. 

The Lord Steward had formerly three courts besides the Board of Green Cloth under him—the Lord Steward's Court, superseded in 1541 by the Marshalsea Court, and the Palace Court. 

The Lord Steward or his deputies formerly administered the oaths to the members of the House of Commons. In certain cases (messages from the sovereign under the sign-manual) the lords with white staves are the proper persons to bear communications between the Sovereign and the Houses of Parliament.

Lord Stewards

15th century
Sir Thomas Rempston 1399–1401
Thomas Percy, 1st Earl of Worcester 1401–1402
William Heron, Lord Say 1402–1404
Sir Thomas Erpingham 1404
Sir John Stanley 1405–1412
Sir Thomas Erpingham 1413–1417
Sir Walter Hungerford 1413–1421
Robert Babthorp 1421–1424
Sir Walter Hungerford 1424–1426
Sir John Tiptoft 1426–1432
Robert Babthorp 1432–1433
William de la Pole, 1st Marquess of Suffolk 1433–1446
Ralph Boteler, 1st Baron Sudeley 1447–1457
John Beauchamp, 1st Baron Beauchamp 1457–1461
William Neville, 1st Earl of Kent 1461–1463
John Tiptoft, 1st Earl of Worcester 1463–1467
Henry Bourchier, 1st Earl of Essex 1467–1471
Thomas Stanley, 2nd Baron Stanley 1471–1483
Thomas Howard, Earl of Surrey 1483–1485
John Radcliffe, Baron FitzWalter 1486–1496
Robert Willoughby, 1st Baron Willoughby de Broke 1496–1502

16th century
George Talbot, 4th Earl of Shrewsbury 1502–1538
Robert Radcliffe, 1st Earl of Sussex 1538–1540
Office of Lord Steward discontinued and replaced by the Lord Great Master
Charles Brandon, 1st Duke of Suffolk 1540–1545
William Paulet, Lord St John 1545–1550
John Dudley, 1st Earl of Warwick 1550–1553
Office of Lord Steward restored
Henry Fitzalan, 12th Earl of Arundel 1553–1564
Vacant 1564–1567
William Herbert, 1st Earl of Pembroke 1567–1570
Vacant 1570–1572
Edward Fiennes, Earl of Lincoln 1572–1584
Robert Dudley, 1st Earl of Leicester 1584–1588
Henry Stanley, Earl of Derby 1588–1593
Vacant 1593–1597

17th century
The Earl of Nottingham 1603–1618
The Duke of Richmond 1618–1623
The Marquess of Hamilton 1623–1625
The Earl of Pembroke 1625–1630
Vacant 1630–1640
The Earl of Arundel and Surrey 1640–1644
The Duke of Richmond 1644–1655
Vacant 1655–1660
The Duke of Ormonde 1660–1688
The Duke of Devonshire 1689–1707

18th century
The Duke of Devonshire 1707–1710
The Duke of Buckingham and Normanby 1710–1711
The Earl Poulett 1711–1714
The Duke of Devonshire 1714–1716
The Duke of Kent 1716–1718
The Duke of Argyll 1718–1725
The Duke of Dorset 1725–1730
The Earl of Chesterfield 1730–1733
The Duke of Devonshire 1733–1737
The Duke of Dorset 1737–1744
The Duke of Devonshire 1744–1749
The Duke of Marlborough 1749–1755
The Duke of Rutland 1755–1761
The Earl Talbot 1761–1782
The Earl of Carlisle 1782–1783
The Duke of Rutland 1783
The Earl of Dartmouth 1783
The Duke of Chandos 1783–1789
The Duke of Dorset 1789–1799
The Earl of Leicester 1799–1802

19th century
The Earl of Dartmouth 1802–1804
The Earl of Aylesford 1804–1812
The Marquess of Cholmondeley 1812–1821
The Marquess Conyngham 1821–1830
The Duke of Buckingham and Chandos 1830
The Marquess Wellesley 1830–1833
The Duke of Argyll 1833–1834
The Earl of Wilton 1835
The Duke of Argyll 1835–1839
The Earl of Erroll 1839–1841
The Earl of Liverpool 1841–1846
The Earl Fortescue 1846–1850
The Marquess of Westminster 1850–1852
The Duke of Montrose 1852–1853
The Duke of Norfolk 1853–1854
The Earl Spencer 1854–1857
The Earl of St Germans 1857–1858
The Marquess of Exeter 1858–1859
The Earl of St Germans 1859–1866
The Earl of Bessborough 1866
The Duke of Marlborough 1866–1867
The Earl of Tankerville 1867–1868
The Earl of Bessborough 1868–1874
The Earl Beauchamp 1874–1880
The Earl Sydney 1880–1885
The Earl of Mount Edgcumbe 1885–1886
The Earl Sydney 1886
The Earl of Mount Edgcumbe 1886–1892
The Marquess of Breadalbane 1892–1895
The Earl of Pembroke 1895–1905

20th century
The Earl of Liverpool 1905–1907
The Earl Beauchamp 1907–1910
The Earl of Chesterfield 1910–1915
The Viscount Farquhar 1915–1922
The Earl of Shaftesbury 1922–1936
The Duke of Sutherland 1936–1937
The Duke of Buccleuch 1937–1940
The Duke of Hamilton 1940–1964
The Duke of Westminster 1964–1967
The Viscount Cobham 1967–1972
The Duke of Northumberland 1973–1988 
The Viscount Ridley 1989–2001

21st century
The Duke of Abercorn 2001–2009
The Earl of Dalhousie 2009–2023
The Earl of Rosslyn 2023–

References

Positions within the British Royal Household
Ceremonial officers in the United Kingdom